Lugagnano Val d'Arda is a comune (municipality) in the Province of Piacenza in the Italian region Emilia-Romagna.

Geography 

Lugagnano Val d'Arda borders the following municipalities: Carpaneto Piacentino, Castell'Arquato, Gropparello, Morfasso, Vernasca.

References

External links
 Official website
 Comunita' Montana Valli del Nure e dell'Arda

Cities and towns in Emilia-Romagna